Azovsky (masculine), Azovskaya (feminine), Azovskoye (neuter), or Azovskiye (plural) is the name of several inhabited localities in Russia.

Urban localities
Azovskoye, Dzhankoysky District, Republic of Crimea, an urban-type settlement in Dzhankoysky District of the Republic of Crimea

Rural localities
Azovsky, Astrakhan Oblast, a settlement in Razdorsky Selsoviet of Kamyzyaksky District in Astrakhan Oblast; 
Azovskoye, Leninsky District, Republic of Crimea, a selo in Leninsky District of the Republic of Crimea
Azovskoye, Kaliningrad Oblast, a settlement in Dobrinsky Rural Okrug of Guryevsky District in Kaliningrad Oblast
Azovskaya, a stanitsa in Azovsky Rural Okrug of Seversky District in Krasnodar Krai; 
Azovskiye, a village in Nytvensky District of Perm Krai

Notes